Bardboran (also Romanized as Bardborān; also known as Bard Borān-e Bandān) is a village in Howmeh-ye Sharqi Rural District, in the Central District of Izeh County, Khuzestan Province, Iran. At the 2006 census, its population was 502, in 90 families.

References 

Populated places in Izeh County